Intelsat VA F-15 or Intelsat 515, then named Columbia 515, was a communications satellite operated by Intelsat and which was later sold to Columbia Communications Corporation. Launched in 1989, it was the fifteenth of fifteen Intelsat V satellites to be launched. The Intelsat V series was constructed by Ford Aerospace, based on the Intelsat VA satellite bus. Intelsat VA F-15 was part of an advanced series of satellites designed to provide greater telecommunications capacity for Intelsat's global network, from an orbital station at 60.0° East.

Satellite 
The satellite was box-shaped, measuring 1.66 by 2.1 by 1.77 metres; solar arrays spanned 15.9 metres tip to tip. The arrays, supplemented by nickel-hydrogen batteries during eclipse, provided 1800 watts of power at mission onset, approximately 1280 watts at the end of its seven-year design life. The payload housed 29 C-band and 6 Ku-band transponders. It could accommodate 15,000 two-way voice circuits and two TV channels simultaneously. It also provided maritime communications for ships at sea.

Launch 
The satellite was successfully launched into space on 27 January 1989, at 01:21:00 UTC, by means of an Ariane 2 vehicle from the Crentre Spatial Guyanais, Kourou, French Guiana. It had a launch mass of 1981 kg.

Columbia 515 
From 1 April 1998, the satellite is used by Columbia Communications Corporation and renamed Columbia 515. The Ku-band payload will not be used anymore. Columbia Communications was granted by FCC to operate a C-Band satellite as a replacement at this location, 37.8° West. The satellite was deactivated in November 2002.

References 

Spacecraft launched in 1989
Intelsat satellites
SES satellites